The following is a list of Dartmouth Big Green men's basketball head coaches. There have been 28 head coaches of the Big Green in their 121-season history.

Dartmouth's current head coach is David McLaughlin. He was hired as the Big Green's head coach in April 2016, replacing Paul Cormier, who was fired after the 2015–16 season.

References

Dartmouth

Dartmouth Big Green men's basketball coaches